Marxist–Leninist Party (Communist Reconstruction) (originally , RC) is a Marxist–Leninist political party operating in Spain, officially registered since 2014.

History
The party's trajectory began in 2009 under the name of Communist Reconstruction (Spanish: Reconstrucción Comunista). It was formed by communists who were active in other organisations and decided to form their own independent organisation.

Its first Congress was held in 2011, in which open criticism of the communist movement in Spain is already on record, especially in relation to internal democracy and the militant culture of the most influential communist parties in the country.

Its main activity at that time was limited to the province of Madrid, and was based mainly on student unionism in the universities, communist training, support for the Kurdish community and activism against the Turkish government of Erdogan. On April 14 of that same year, they broke into the already traditional demonstration for the Third Republic in the city of Madrid, carrying out a parade of combative aesthetics in honor of the fallen anti-fascists of the Civil War. Since then, every year the PML(RC) organizes its parade, in which more than a thousand people participated in 2019.

Consolidation (2012-2015) 
Between the years 2012-2014, the party increased its work in the international arena, supporting some anti-repressive causes in Iran and Ecuador, as well as the Naxalite Insurgency in India, although over time they broke relations with the Maoist organizations that supported this movement. The PML(RC) would also participate in the general strikes that characterized the 2010-2012 period, and supported the creation of platforms against repression after the considerable increase in police charges and arrests during the peak of the mobilizations.

In 2013 they would hold their Second Congress, in which they would formalize their criticism of Maoism as an anti-Marxist current, as well as their anti-imperialist position regarding the US and China-Russia as 'two reactionary political-economic blocs' and 'contrary to progress' of the peoples'.

On March 8, 2013 they would make public the creation of their youth as a party, the Young Guard (Bolshevik). On March 22 of this same year they would participate in the Marches of Dignity, but forming a 'Combative and class' bloc denouncing the supposed "inter-class" and "reformist" tint that the mobilizations had acquired, a block in which other leftist organizations participated.

During the years 2013 and 2014, the PML(RC) managed to spread to new regions such as Valencia, Castellón, the Basque Country, Cuenca or Jaén, among others.

On April 10, 2015, the III Congress took place, in which they would be refounded as PML(RC), thus formalizing the qualitative change experienced in the organization and its extension to new areas in the rest of Spain, such as Barcelona or Tarragona.

Temporary party ban 
In December 2014, two PML(RC) militants volunteered for the International Liberation Battalion to fight Daesh in the Syrian Civil War. After their return to Spain in July 2015 they were arrested  and accused of being part of the Kurdistan Workers' Party (PKK), considered a terrorist organization by the European Union. Both they and their party denied these accusations. In their statements they stated that they worked together with the YPG and that the decision was totally individual and voluntary. On January 27, 2016, due to the police collaboration of one of the brigade members, Operation Valle was carried out, ordered by the Investigating Court No. 6 of the National High Court, instructed by Judge Eloy Velasco. Eight PML(RC) militants and a citizen of Kurdish origin were arrested, accused of criminal organization and collaboration with a terrorist group.

In addition to the arrests, the National Court estimated the suspension of PML(RC) activity as a precautionary measure for one year, the closure of all its offices and the entry into prison of the citizen of Kurdish origin and two militants of the party, among them that of the Secretary General, Roberto Vaquero Arribas, who was imprisoned in solitary confinement for nearly two months until, due to lack of evidence, he was released. Currently all the defendants are at liberty, pending the resolution of the appeal to the Supreme Court that requests the acquittal of the defendants.

Post-illegalization activity 
At the end of the year of precautionary measure and not being extended by the National High Court, the PML(RC) was acquitted of all the charges against it, resuming its public activity by carrying out a parade in commemoration of the Republic, on April 8 of 2017.

As of 2018, the PML(RC) becomes the base on which the so-called Frente Obrero (Workers' Front), an organization with quite a few media peaks thanks to exposing political leaders such as Íñigo Errejón, Pablo Iglesias or Irene Montero. They also became known thanks to the Esperanza Obrera (Workers' Hope) initiative in the city of Valencia where, after occupying a building, they gave food to several hundred individuals as well as accommodation and labor advice.

References

2014 establishments in Spain
Communist parties in Spain
Anti-revisionist organizations
Stalinist parties
Hoxhaist parties
Far-left politics in Spain
Anti-fascist organisations in Spain
Anti-ISIL factions
Formerly banned communist parties
Banned political parties in Spain
Communist militant groups
International Coordination of Revolutionary Parties and Organizations
International Freedom Battalion
Left-wing militant groups in Spain
Military units and factions of the Syrian civil war
Political parties established in 2014
Republican parties in Spain